Sleep No More is an immersive theatre production created by British theatre company Punchdrunk. Based on Punchdrunk's original 2003 London production, the company reinvented Sleep No More in a co-production with the American Repertory Theater (A.R.T.), which opened at the Old Lincoln School in Brookline, Massachusetts on October 8, 2009.
It won Punchdrunk the Elliot Norton Award for Best Theatrical Experience 2010.

Overview
The production was a new and expanded version of Punchdrunk's 2003 production of the same name which was performed in the Beaufoy Building, London, a disused Victorian school.  Unlike a conventional stage play, Sleep No More is an immersive experience in which audiences are free to explore the world of the performance at will. It combined plot and characters of Shakespeare's Macbeth with characters, narrative, and aesthetic elements inspired by the films of Hitchcock, in particular Rebecca, an adaptation of the novel of the same name by English author Daphne du Maurier.

Relationship to Macbeth
Assistant director Paul Stacey says that "every line of Shakespeare's Macbeth is embedded in the multiple languages—sound, light, design, and dance—of Sleep No More."

Characters
There were 18 characters in the 2009 production of Sleep No More, most of them taken directly from Shakespeare's Scottish tragedy,  Macbeth.

Immersion of audience
Audience members are invited to explore the world of the production in their own time, choosing for themselves what to watch and where to go.

Unlike a conventional play, in which all audience members share the experience of witnessing the same events on the same stage, Sleep No More provides the audience with a more fragmented, multi-layered and individualized experience. As directors Felix Barrett and Maxine Doyle say in the program notes, "exploring the space individually, the audience is given the opportunity to both act in and direct their own film; to revisit, to edit and to indulge themselves as voyeurs."

Absence of dialogue
Though the plot is driven forward by events and interactions, Punchdrunk has developed a unique physical performance language in which there is almost no speaking by the performers. In describing Sleep No More, the directors write that "Screen dialogues become intense physical duets between characters and the body becomes the site of debate. Spoken words rarely find their way into our world; we are excited by the human body as a primary source of emotive storytelling."

Old Lincoln School
The venue for Sleep No More was the surplus Old Lincoln School at 194 Boylston Street (Route 9) in Brookline, Massachusetts. The complex and overlapping subplots unfolded across 44 rooms on all four stories of the school building.

Credits
Sleep No More is directed and devised by Felix Barrett and Maxine Doyle, with the company.
Felix Barrett....Director and Designer
Maxine Doyle....Director and Choreographer
Stephen Dobbie....Sound and Graphic Designer
Livi Vaughan....Associate Designer
Beatrice Minns....Associate Designer
David Israel Reynoso....Costumer (Costume Designer)
Mikhael Tara Garver....Staff Director
Paul Stacey....Assistant Director
Carolyn Rae Boyd....Stage Manager

Cast (October 8 - November 8)
Phil Atkins as Duncan
Hector Harkness as Malcolm
Geir Hytten as Macbeth
Vinicius Salles as Banquo
Robert McNeill as Macduff
Thomas Kee as Porter
Sarah Dowling as Lady Macbeth
Alli Ross as Lady Macduff
Conor Doyle as Witch
Stephanie Eaton as Witch
Fernanda Prata as Witch
Careena Melia as Hecate
Poornima Kirby as The Second Mrs. de Winter
Tori Sparks as Mrs. Danvers
Alexander LaFrance as Bellhop/Taxidermist
Deo Azben as Speakeasy Bartender
Annie Goodchild as Annie Darcy
Hayley Jane Soggin as Elsie Price
Robert Najarian as Man in Bar

Cast (from November 10)
Phil Atkins as Duncan
Robert Najarian as Malcolm
Eric Jackson-Bradley as Macbeth
Jeffery Lyon as Banquo
Luke Murphy as Macduff
Thomas Kee as Porter
Tori Sparks as Lady Macbeth
Alli Ross as Lady Macduff
Jordan Morley as Witch
Stephanie Eaton as Witch
Kelly Bartnik as Witch
Careena Melia as Hecate
Poornima Kirby as The Second Mrs. de Winter
Hope T. Davis as Mrs. Danvers
Alexander LaFrance as Bellhop/Taxidermist
Deo Azben as Speakeasy Bartender
Annie Goodchild as Annie Darcy
Hayley Jane Soggin as Elsie Price
Matt Spano as Charlie, Man in Bar

The Annie Darcy Band
Bass/Sax....Timo Shanko
Drums....Django Carranza
Piano....Rusty Scott

Sleep No More and the ART
Sleep No More was presented as part of the ART's Shakespeare Exploded! festival, which included The Donkey Show, a disco adaptation of A Midsummer Night's Dream, and Best of Both Worlds, an R&B/gospel musical inspired by The Winter's Tale.

Production dates
Though the production was to run from October 8, 2009 to January 3, 2010, the run was extended through February 7, 2010. The extended run sold out. Sleep No More won Punchdrunk the Elliot Norton Award for Outstanding Theatrical Experience 2010.

Reviews

Encore Magazine review
Boston Globe reviews 1 2
Harvard Crimson review
Broookline Tab review
The Guardian review
Variety review

See also

Site-specific theatre
Postmodern theatre

References

External links

Postmodern plays
2009 plays
Theatre in Massachusetts
Plays and musicals based on Macbeth
Plays set in Scotland
British plays
Plays based on films